Al Sabo can refer to:

 Al Sabo Preserve, in Texas Township, Michigan
 Albert F. Sabo (1920–2002), American lawyer and judge in Pennsylvania